Fayodia is a genus of fungi in the family Tricholomataceae. It was first described by Robert Kühner in Bull. Bi-Mens. Soc. Linn. Lyon Vol.9 on page 68 in 1930, and the specific epithet honors the Swiss mycologist Victor Fayod (1860–1900). The widespread genus contains 10 species, mostly in the northern temperate regions.

See also

List of Tricholomataceae genera

References

External links

Tricholomataceae
Agaricales genera